Valentina Georgievna Tokarskaya (Russian: Валентина Георгиевна Токарская) (1906-1996) was a Russian film and stage actress.

Selected filmography

Malenkie komedii bolshogo doma (TV movie) (1975)  Kira Platonovna
Dro itsureba gantiadisas (1965)
Ispytatelnyy srok (1960) The croupier
Delo N. 306 (1957) Karasyova
Marionetki (1934) "Mi" - The Singing Star

External links

Russian stage actresses
Russian film actresses
1906 births
1996 deaths
20th-century Russian actresses